Wouter Wippert (born 14 August 1990) is a Dutch professional road racing cyclist, who most recently rode for UCI Continental team . In 2015, Wippert took a stage win in the UCI World Tour race Tour Down Under.

Career
In the 2015 Tour of California, he was on the podium three times in presence of Mark Cavendish and Peter Sagan among other fast finishers. He also won a pair of stages in that year's Tour de Taiwan and the Tour de Korea.

Major results

2010
 1st Stage 8 Okolo Slovenska
2011
 1st Stage 2 Tour de Berlin
 1st Stage 3 Tour de l'Avenir
 6th Beverbeek Classic
 7th Road race, UCI Under-23 Road World Championships
 7th Dorpenomloop Rucphen
 7th Grote Prijs Stad Geel
 10th Internationale Wielertrofee Jong Maar Moedig
2012
 1st Stage 5 Le Triptyque des Monts et Châteaux
 3rd  Road race, UEC European Under-23 Road Championships
 3rd Grote Prijs Stad Zottegem
 5th La Côte Picarde
 5th ZLM Tour
 6th Ronde van Drenthe
 9th Road race, UCI Under-23 Road World Championships
2013
 2nd Ronde van Noord-Holland
 4th Halle–Ingooigem
 4th Dutch Food Valley Classic
 6th Grote 1-MeiPrijs
 7th Zuid Oost Drenthe Classic I
 7th Dorpenomloop Rucphen
 9th Arno Wallaard Memorial
2014
 Tour de Kumano
1st  Points classification
1st Stages 1 & 3
 New Zealand Cycle Classic
1st Stages 2 & 4
 1st Stage 3 Tour de Taiwan
 1st Stage 2 Tour of Japan
 1st Stage 9 Tour of Hainan
 5th Overall Tour of China II
1st Stage 4
2015
 Tour de Taiwan
1st Stages 1 & 3
 Tour de Korea
1st Stages 1 & 6
 1st Stage 6 Tour Down Under
 3rd Down Under Classic
2016
 Czech Cycling Tour
1st  Points classification
1st Stage 1 (TTT)
 2nd Road race, National Road Championships
 2nd Heistse Pijl
 8th Scheldeprijs
2017
 Tour of Alberta
1st  Points classification
1st Stages 2 & 4
 2nd Road race, National Road Championships
 2nd Arnhem–Veenendaal Classic
 5th London–Surrey Classic
2018
 1st Omloop Mandel-Leie-Schelde
 2nd Heistse Pijl
 2nd Arnhem–Veenendaal Classic
 4th Dorpenomloop Rucphen
2019
 Belgrade Banjaluka
1st Stages 2 & 3
 1st Stage 5 Tour de Hongrie
 4th Overall Boucles de la Mayenne

References

External links

1990 births
Living people
Dutch male cyclists
UCI Road World Championships cyclists for the Netherlands
European Games competitors for the Netherlands
Cyclists at the 2015 European Games
People from Wierden
Cyclists from Overijssel
21st-century Dutch people